Dariush Talai plays both the Tar and Setar.

Born in 1953 in Iran, he studied Persian music with masters of the Radif. His teachers include Tar player Ali Akbar Shahnazi, Nur Ali Borumand with whom he studied radif and old compositions, as well as youssef Forutan and Abdollah Davami, with whom he studied Setar and vocal techniques and repertories.

Master Talai taught at the University of Tehran, University of Sorbonne-Paris, University of Washington-Seattle and was awarded a number of major prizes for his contribution to Persian Art Music. His collaboration with artists such as Maurice Béjart, Carolyn Carlson, Michel Portal.

Recordings
1978  Anthologie de la musique traditionnelle - Setar and Tar (Record: Ref. Paris OCORA 558540).
1980  Tradition classique de l'Iran (Record: Ref. Harmonia Mundi No. 1031), France.
Side A: Improvisation in Shur - SideB: Improvisation in Mahour
(D. Talai, Tar / D.Chemirani, Zarb).

1982  Trobada de music a de mediterrani Vol. 1, Face 1 (Record: Ref. Diffusion mediterrania-lsagunt 17-13a 46009 Valencia).
1983  Musique traditionnelle, Radio France (Two cassettes, Ref. OCORA 4558617/8).
Cassette n°1:
SideA Improvisation in Mahour (D.Talai, Tar / D.Chemirani, Zarb).
FaceB Improvisation in Shur (D.Talai, Setar / D.Chemirani, Zarb).
Cassette n°2:
SideA Improvisation in Tchahargagh (D.Talai, Tar / D.Chemirani, Zarb).
SideB Improvisation (D.Chemirani, Zarb), Tchaharmezrab Darvish khan (D.Talai, Setar / D.Chemirani, Zarb).

1987  Dariush Talai: Tar and Setar (Cassette).
SideA Improvisation in Nava, and (SideB) Modulation in Shur (D.Talai, Tar / D.Chemirani, Zarb).
SideB Improvisation in Mahour (D.Talai, Setar / M.Gavihelm, Zarb).

1988  Le Târ et le Sétâr de Dariush Talai (Video Tape, CEMO-INALCO).
1991  Iran: Les Maîtres de la Musique Traditionnelle, France ;Vol.3 and Bands on Vol.1, Setar and Tar (CD, Ref.Paris OCORA C560024).
Vol.1
Band 1 Improvisation in Avaz-e Bayat-e Esfahan (D.Talai, Tar).
Band 2 Improvisation in Tchahargah (D.Talai, Setar).
Vol3
Bands 1 to 4 Avaz-e Afshari - Bands 5 to end Dastgah-e Mahour
(Shahram Nazeri, Vocal / D.Talai, Setar / B.Kamkar, Zarb and Daf).

1992  Performance of Radif of Mirza Abdollah on the Setar and the book "A new Approach to the Theory of Persian Art Music" (in Iran).
1992  Performance on Setar (in Iran).
In Shur, Bayet-e Esfahan and Segah (D.Talai, Setar).

1993  Concerti Digar (in Iran).
In Afshari and Mahour (D.Talai, Setar / Sh.Nazeri, Singer).

1993  Iran: Les Grands Interprètes - Tradition Classique de l'Iran II, Le Târ (CD, Ref. Harmonia Mundi No.
1901031), France.
The CD edition of the Record Ref. Harmonia Mundi No. 1031, listed above: Improvisation in Shur - Improvisation in Mahour (D. Talai, Tar / D.Chemirani, Zarb).

1993  Performance of Radif of Mirza Ahdollah on the Setar in France (5 CDs) Al Sur.
Vol 1 Dastgah-e Shur, Avaz-e Bayat-e Kord
Vol 2 Avaz-e Dashti, Avaz-e Bayat-e Esfahan, Dastgah-e Homayoun
Vol 3 Dastgah-e Nava, Dastgah-e Segah, Avaz-e Afshari
Vol 4 Dastgah-e Mahour, Avaz-e Bayat-e Tork
Vol 5 Dastgah-e Tchahargah, Dastgah-e Rast-Panjgah

1997   Performance on Tar (in Iran) : Sayeh Roshan.
In Nava (D.Talai, Tar).

1998  Performance on Setar (in Iran) : Tchahargah.
In Tchahargah (D.Talai, Setar).

1998  Dariush Talai en concert - Concert of Utrecht August 30, 1996 (CD), Al Sur.
1-Sâyé roshan (in Dashti) 2-Hekâyat1 (in Abou ata) 3-Yorghé (in Abou ata) 4-Naghmé (in Abou ata) 5-Hekâyat2 (in
Neyshabourak and Nava) 6-Jamal (in Khojaste) 7-Khâb (in Forud bé Nava) 8-Aqiq (in Nava) 9-Elam (in Nava) 10-Sahari (in Nava) 11-Lâbé (in Nava) 12-Koubé (in Nahoft and Neyshabourak) 13-Anjâm (in Forud bé Nava) 14-Shâdegâni.

2004  Vocal Calligraphy - The art of classical Persian song
Dariush Talai, Tar - Ali Reza Ghorbani, Vocal - Djamchid Chemirani, Zarb
Abou'Ata : 1-Pishdaramad 2-Daramad 3-Hejaz 4-Tasnif. Nasimeh Sahar 5-Bayate Kord 6-Tasnif. Bahare delkash.
Homayun : 1-Pishdaramad 2-Daramad 3-Chakavak 4-Bidad 5-Oj 6-Razavi 7-Tasnif. Jelve ye gol.

2005  Great Mediterranean masters, Dariush Talai, Tar and Setar, 1-Dastgâh Mâhur 2-Dastgâh Navâ 3-Âvaz Esfehân 4-Dastgâh Shur 5-Dastgâh Segâh

References

External link

1953 births
Living people
Iranian composers
Iranian setar players
Iranian tar players
People from Tehran
Persian classical musicians
Academic staff of the University of Paris
Academic staff of the University of Tehran
University of Washington faculty
Iran's Book of the Year Awards recipients